Geophis tarascae, also known as the Tarascan earth snake, is a snake of the colubrid family. It is found in Mexico.

References

Geophis
Snakes of North America
Reptiles of Mexico
Endemic fauna of Mexico
Taxa named by Norman Edouard Hartweg
Reptiles described in 1959